The 1999–2000 FR Yugoslavia Cup was the seventh season of the FR Yugoslavia's annual football cup. The cup defenders was Red Star Belgrade, and they were him successfully defended, after they defeated FK Napredak Kruševac in the final.

First round
Thirty-two teams entered in the First Round. The matches were played on 23, 24 and 25 November 1999.

|}
Note: Roman numerals in brackets denote the league tier the clubs participated in the 1999–2000 season.

Second round
The 16 winners from the prior round enter this round. The matches were played on 8 and 10 December 1999.

|}
Note: Roman numerals in brackets denote the league tier the clubs participated in the 1999–2000 season.

Quarter-finals
The eight winners from the prior round enter this round. The matches were played on 5 April 2000.

|}
Note: Roman numerals in brackets denote the league tier the clubs participated in the 1999–2000 season.

Semi-finals

Note: Roman numerals in brackets denote the league tier the clubs participated in the 1999–2000 season.

Final

Note: Roman numerals in brackets denote the league tier the clubs participated in the 1999–2000 season.

See also
 1999–2000 First League of FR Yugoslavia
 1999–2000 Second League of FR Yugoslavia

References

External links
Results on RSSSF

FR Yugoslavia Cup
Cup
Yugo